Western & Southern Financial Group, also commonly referred to as Western & Southern, is a Cincinnati, Ohio-based diversified family of financial services companies with $111.6 billion in assets owned and managed as of December 2021. As of 2022, it held a "AA- Very Strong" rating from Standard & Poor's, a "A+ Superior" from A.M. Best, a "AA Very Strong" from Fitch, a "Aa3 Excellent" from Moody's, and a "96 out of 100" Comdex ranking.

Through its member companies, Western & Southern offers a variety of financial services such as life insurance, annuities, mutual funds and investment management. Western & Southern's member companies include The Western & Southern Life Insurance Co, Western-Southern Life Assurance Co, Columbus Life Insurance Co, Gerber Life Insurance Company, Integrity Life Insurance Co, National Integrity Life Insurance Co, Lafayette Life Insurance Co, IFS Financial Services, Fort Washington Investment Advisors, Touchstone Investments, and Eagle Realty Group.

History
Western & Southern hosts the Western & Southern Open tennis tournament.  This tennis event has contributed more than $5.5 million to charities in the Greater Cincinnati community.

Western & Southern played a key role in the development of the Great American Tower at Queen City Square project in downtown Cincinnati, Ohio.

In May 2013, Western & Southern signed a controversial agreement with Cincinnati Union Bethel to purchase the historic Anna Louise Inn in downtown Cincinnati. In 2014, Western & Southern Financial Group, owner of many properties within the Lytle Park Historic District asked the city to remove the historic status of several historic buildings. The company hopes to remove sections of the district in order to build new office space.

In 2015, Western & Southern became the title sponsor of the annual WEBN fireworks show.

On September 17, 2018, Western & Southern announced that it would be acquiring the Gerber Life Insurance Company from Nestle for $1.55 billion along with a long-term intellectual property license in connection with financial services. The acquisition is expected to increase Western & Southern’s assets to $77.1 billion and increase its ratio of life insurance to annuity business.

In November 2019, Western & Southern Financial Group promoted John Bultema as CEO of Lafayette Life Insurance Co.

On 9 March 2020, Legacy Marketing Group formed a strategic partnership with Western & Southern Financial Group to create and sell a Western & Southern member company's patented fixed indexed annuity products.

See also 
 List of United States insurance companies

References

External links
Western & Southern Financial Group website

Insurance companies of the United States
Life insurance companies of the United States
American companies established in 1888
Financial services companies established in 1888
Mutual insurance companies of the United States
Companies based in Cincinnati